Diolcus is a genus of shield-backed bugs in the family Scutelleridae. There are at least three described species in Diolcus.

Species
These three species belong to the genus Diolcus:
 Diolcus chrysorrhoeus (Fabricius, 1803)
 Diolcus irroratus (Fabricius, 1775)
 Diolcus variegatus (Herrich-Schaeffer, 1836)

References

Further reading

 
 
 

Scutelleridae
Articles created by Qbugbot